The following lists events that happened during 2016 in the Republic of Moldova.

Incumbents
 President – Nicolae Timofti (until December 23), Igor Dodon (starting December 23)
 Prime Minister – Gheorghe Brega (until January 20), Pavel Filip (starting January 20)
 President of the Parliament – Andrian Candu

Events

January
 January 14 - Thousands of Moldovans march the streets in protest against proposed candidate for Prime Minister Vlad Plahotniuc.

August
August 5-21 - 12 athletes from Moldova competed in the 2016 Summer Olympics in Rio de Janeiro, Brazil
August 27 - Moldova celebrated its 25th anniversary since its independence from the USSR in 1991.

October 
October 30 - Igor Dodon wins the presidential election in Moldova.

December 
December 23 - Igor Dodon is sworn in as the President of Moldova in the Palace of the Republic in Chișinău.

References

 
2010s in Moldova
Years of the 21st century in Moldova
Moldova
Moldova